The 1948–49 season was CA Oradea's 26th season, 16th in the Romanian football league system and their 13th season in the Divizia A. In this season the club was known as Întreprinderea Comunală Orășenească Oradea, ICO Oradea or simply as ICO and managed to obtain the second big performance in the history of the football from Oradea, a Divizia A title. The first title won in Romania and the second title won at club level, after the 1943-44 Nemzeti Bajnokság I, being the first club to succeed to be crowned as both the champion of Romania and Hungary.

First team squad

Competitions

Overview

Result round by round

Results

Cupa României

See also

1948–49 Cupa României
1948–49 Divizia A

Notes and references

CA Oradea seasons
1948–49 in Romanian football